I Can't Believe It's Yogurt is a chain of stores that serves soft-serve frozen yogurt products in the United States. The company has franchised and company-owned stores and non-traditional partnerships for licensing of its products.

History
I Can't Believe It's Yogurt! was founded in 1977 by Bill and Julie Brice from Dallas, Texas. Later, it was owned under parent company Brice Foods. In 1984, it sued TCBY, whose company name was originally "This Can't Be Yogurt!". The lawsuit forced TCBY to change its name to "The Country's Best Yogurt!".

I Can't Believe It's Yogurt! was acquired by Yogen Früz in 1996.

1991 Austin massacre

In 1991, four young girls were murdered in an I Can't Believe It's Yogurt! shop in Austin, Texas. The case remains unsolved.

References

External links
 I Can't Believe It's Yogurt Official Website

Ice cream parlors
Fast-food chains of Canada
Fast-food chains of the United States
Companies based in Markham, Ontario
Fast-food franchises
Restaurants established in 1977
1977 establishments in Texas
Frozen yogurt businesses
1996 mergers and acquisitions